Jackson Hately (born 21 October 2000) is an Australian rules footballer playing for the Adelaide Football Club in the Australian Football League (AFL).

Early career

Born in Canberra before growing up in Adelaide, Hately played 12 SANFL games for Central District in 2018 as a seventeen year old. He won All-Australian selection for his performances for South Australia in the NAB Under-18 National Championships. He was selected as a first round pick #14 in the 2018 national draft.

AFL career
He made his senior debut against Fremantle in round 5 of the 2019 season. After 13 games in two years, 
Hately requested a trade so he could return to Adelaide. He joined  in the 2020 pre season draft.

Statistics
Statistics are correct to the end of Round 16 2021

|- 
! scope="row" style="text-align:center" | 2019
|  || 9|| 7 || 2 || 1 || 60 || 52 || 112 || 33 || 24 || 0.3 || 0.1 || 8.6 || 7.4 || 16.0 || 4.7 || 3.4
|- style="background-color: #EAEAEA"
! scope="row" style="text-align:center" | 2020
|  || 9 || 6 || 0 || 0 || 47 || 35|| 82 || 28 || 14 || 0.0 || 0.0 || 7.8 || 5.8 || 13.7 || 4.7 || 2.3
|- style="background-color: #EAEAEA"
! scope="row" style="text-align:center" | 2021
|  || 6 || 3 || 0 || 2 || 18 || 17|| 35 || 7 || 12 || 0.0 || 0.6 || 6.0 || 5.6 || 11.6 || 2.3 || 4.0
|- class="sortbottom"
! colspan=3| Career
! 16
! 2
! 3
! 125
! 104
! 229
! 68
! 50
! 0.1
! 0.1
! 7.8
! 6.5
! 14.3
! 4.2
! 3.1
|}

References

External links

Greater Western Sydney Giants players
Australian rules footballers from the Australian Capital Territory
Australian rules footballers from South Australia
Central District Football Club players
2000 births
Living people